Mohammed bin Hamad bin Qassim Al Abdullah Al Thani is the Qatari Minister of Commerce and Industry. He was appointed as minister on 19 October 2021.

References 

Living people
Government ministers of Qatar
21st-century Qatari politicians
Qatari politicians
Year of birth missing (living people)